Mark Vincent Hurd (January 1, 1957 – October 18, 2019) was an American technology executive who served as Co-CEO and as a member of the board of directors of Oracle Corporation. He had previously served as Chairman, Chief Executive Officer, and president of Hewlett-Packard, before resigning in 2010. He was also on the Board of Directors of Globality and was a member of the Technology CEO Council and board of directors of News Corporation until 2010.

Early life and education
Hurd was born in New York City, the son of Teresa A. (Fanoni), a debutante, and Ralph Steiner Hurd, a financier. He graduated from Archbishop Curley-Notre Dame High School, in Miami, Florida, in 1975. In 1979, Hurd graduated with a Bachelor of Business Administration from Baylor University, in Waco, Texas. He received a tennis scholarship to attend Baylor University and was a member of Phi Delta Theta.

Career

NCR (1980–2005)
Hurd spent 25 years at NCR Corporation, culminating in a two-year tenure as chief executive officer and president. He was named president of NCR in 2001 and was given additional responsibilities as chief operating officer in 2002. He began working for NCR as a junior salesman in San Antonio in 1980 after Rodney Gray hired him and subsequently held a variety of positions in general management, operations, and sales and marketing. He also served as head of the company's Teradata data-warehousing division for three years.

Hewlett-Packard (2005–2010)
 After the board forced chairman and CEO Carly Fiorina to resign in January 2005 over policy differences following the Compaq merger, executive vice president and CFO Robert P. Wayman became interim CEO for several months. Hurd was appointed permanent CEO and also held the title of President, a post which was not used by several of his predecessors (Michael Capellas was President of HP for a transitional period in 2002 after its merger with Compaq).

Hurd was also elected to the board of directors but unlike previous CEOs, he was initially not designated to be chairman of the board which was instead filled by a non-executive director. On September 22, 2006, Hurd succeeded Pat Dunn as board chairman after she resigned due to the pretexting controversy.

Under his leadership, the company became the leader of the sale of laptop computers in 2006, and the leader in the sale of desktop computers in 2007. In 2008, it increased its market share in inkjet printers and laser printers to 46% and 50.5%, respectively. In March 2009, Hurd forecast that HP's sales could drop as much as 5% that year, in the midst of the recession, but that its profit would increase by nearly 6%. Under Hurd's tenure, the company met Wall Street expectations in 21 out of 22 quarters and increased profits for 22 straight quarters, while its revenue rose 63% and stock price doubled.

While the merger of Hewlett-Packard and Compaq was heavily criticized back in 2002, Hurd managed to make the combined company execute successfully, something his predecessor Fiorina had failed to do. The New York Times said Hurd had "pulled off one of the great rescue missions in American corporate history, refocusing the strife-ridden company and leading it to five years of revenue gains and a stock that soared 130 percent".

Hurd was said to have run HP "with a founder's authority. He was the de facto CEO, CFO, COO and head salesman". Hurd had a reputation for aggressive cost-cutting. He laid off 15,200 workers  — 10% of the workforce — shortly after becoming CEO. Other cost-cutting included  reducing the IT department from 19,000 to 8,000, reducing the number of software applications that HP used from 6,000 to 1,500, and consolidating HP's 85 data centers to 6. During the 2009 recession, depending on job role Hurd imposed a temporary 5%, 10% or 15% pay cut on all employees and removed many benefits. He himself took a base salary pay cut of 20%, although the compensation committee increased his bonus by the same amount. Hurd's emphasis on short-term results and financial management, particularly cutting costs, taking the lead in the PC business, plus acquisitions (EDS and 3Com), were successful in raising profits and shareholder return. Detractors, however, viewed it as a continuation of empire building, which started with the acquisition of Compaq in 2002 several years before Hurd joined HP.

In 2007. while serving as chairman and CEO at Hewlett-Packard, Hurd was named one of Fortune Magazine's 25 most powerful people in business. In 2008, The San Francisco Chronicle named Hurd as CEO of the year. In 2009, Hurd was listed as one of Forbes' top gun CEOs.

In 2008, Hurd's total compensation was $39,952,237, including a base salary of $1,450,000, stock award of $7,907,660, cash bonus of $23,931,882, and $662,695 in perquisites and other compensation. It was the largest bonus of any CEO in 2008. In 2009, Hurd made a total of $24,201,448, including a base salary of $1,268,750, stock award of $6,648,092, cash bonus of $15,809,414 and $475,192 in benefits and other compensation.

On August 6, 2010, Hurd resigned from all of his positions at HP, with the Board of Directors appointing CFO Cathie Lesjak as interim CEO. Hurd's decision was made after an investigation into whether Hurd violated HP's code of business conduct following claims made by former contractor, Jodie Fisher. The investigation concluded that the company's sexual-harassment policy was not violated, but in the course of investigating the allegations, they found that Hurd had submitted inaccurate expense reports. Outside observers suggested the company's board of directors had made a poor decision and may have had mixed motives in requiring his resignation in order to mitigate negative publicity. Fisher herself expressed regrets at the outcome.

Oracle Corporation (2010–2019)

On September 6, 2010, Hurd was named president of Oracle Corporation alongside Safra A. Catz, succeeding former president Charles Phillips. Hurd was also appointed a member of the Oracle Corporation board of directors. Hurd and Catz were appointed by then-CEO Larry Ellison. HP then sued Hurd, claiming he would violate agreements to protect HP's secrets by assuming that high-level role at Oracle; the lawsuit was settled two weeks later, with Hurd giving up about half the compensation owed him by HP.

Hurd revamped the company's salesforce in 2013, a process that had initially started two years prior. Hurd changed the compensation for Oracle's sales representatives in order to sell more hardware, hired additional sales representatives, and reduced the number of accounts covered by each salesperson. In April 2013, he reported that the sales force had increased by 4,000. His plans to revamp initially faced flak from veteran sales representatives, some of whom left Oracle to work for competitors.

In 2013, Hurd launched the “Class Of” program to hire thousands of college graduates and groom those graduates to become sales representatives, helping to sell Oracle's cloud. His idea was inspired by a dinner he had with his daughter and her friends who recently graduated from college. As a result of the program's success and plans for expansion, the company built a new campus in Austin, Texas, to house employees that were part of Hurd's "Class Of" program. Hurd reported in 2015 that Oracle recruits 1,300 students each year.

On September 18, 2014, Ellison announced he was stepping down as CEO of Oracle, with Hurd and Catz becoming co-CEOs. Hurd was given control of sales, service and marketing departments, while Catz was to oversee operations, legal and finance departments.

Under Hurd, Oracle accelerated its focus on cloud technology and modernized its legacy software to compete with smaller cloud-based firms. In 2016, Hurd said that Oracle's cloud business had grown 82% between 2015 and 2016 as well as invested $5.1 billion into research and development in improving its cloud services.

Oracle acquired several cloud-based companies in 2016 under Hurd, including SaaS enterprise resource planning company NetSuite, Textura cloud services for the engineering and construction vertical, cloud-based warehouse management application company LogFire, and Opower, a provider of cloud services to the utilities industry.

Personal life
Mark Hurd married Elizabeth A. Butler on August 23, 1980; they divorced on October 14, 1987. Hurd and his second wife, Paula Kalupa, an executive with NCR, married in 1990. They had two daughters, Kathryn and Kelly.

In September 2019, Hurd announced his intention to go on leave for unspecified health reasons. He also said co-CEO Safra Catz and Oracle founder CTO Larry Ellison would be managing the organization while he was away. Hurd died on October 18, 2019, reportedly of cancer.

Bibliography
 The Value Factor: How Global Leaders Use Information for Growth and Competitive Advantage by Mark Hurd and Lars Nyberg, Bloomberg Press, 2004, 
 Fall 2003 Baylor Business Review "Enterprise Decision-Making" by Mark Hurd,

References

External links

1957 births
2019 deaths
20th-century American businesspeople
21st-century American businesspeople
American chairpersons of corporations
American chief operating officers
American technology chief executives
Baylor University alumni
Businesspeople from Queens, New York
Hewlett-Packard people
NCR Corporation people
Oracle employees
People from Queens, New York
Teradata
Archbishop Curley-Notre Dame High School alumni